Darul Uloom Hathazari, also known as Hathazari Madrasa, is the oldest and largest Qawmi madrasa in Bangladesh. In 2010, Hefazat-e-Islam Bangladesh emerged from this Madrasa, gaining widespread attention during the 2013 anti-government protests. At that time, Shah Ahmad Shafi served as the organization's Amir, while Junaid Babunagari was the Secretary-General. Babunagari continued to hold his position in the madrasa after Shafi. However, since the 2013 movement, both leaders have undergone changes in their thinking. While Ahmad Shafi gradually distanced himself from the opposition stance against the government, Junaid Babunagari remained unwavering in his position.

Anas Madani, the son of Ahmad Shafi, played a significant role in his father's change of thinking. Madani's involvement in various controversial activities using the influence of his father has raised concerns. The madrasa officials were divided into two groups, and the conflict between them came to light after Anas Madani's supporters, led by him, held a meeting of the management committee and removed Junaid Babunagari from his position as the assistant director of the madrasa. As a result, on September 16, 2020, students began protesting, demanding the removal of Anas Madani and Ahmad Shafi from the post of Director-General, making Shafi an advisor instead, among other demands.

Background 
On May 5th, 2013, a large rally was held by Hefazat-e-Islam Bangladesh at Shapla Chattar in Motijheel, Dhaka. However, during the rally, law enforcement agencies conducted an operation and arrested numerous leaders, including the Secretary-General of the organization, Junayed Babunagari. The Amir of the organization, Shah Ahmed Shafi, was allowed to return to Chittagong. Several cases were filed against Hefazat-e-Islam leaders in connection with this incident. As a result of this event, Hefazat-e-Islam emerged as a political force.

Protest 
On September 16, 2020, after the Zuhr prayer, students at the madrasa began protesting for various demands on the madrasa grounds, which caused disruption for the teachers. During the protest, they chanted various slogans and vandalized the room of Anas Madani. Additionally, the students repeatedly announced over the mosque's microphone to prevent any action by the administration inside the madrasa. A rally was also organized in Dhaka in support of the protest under the leadership of former VP Nurul Haque Nur. In the afternoon, Mainuddin Ruhi, an associate of Anas Madani, was beaten by angry students who accused him of sowing the seeds of irregularities and anarchy in Hathazari Madrasa.

Demand 
The students initiated this protest with five demands. Subsequently, a leaflet was circulated in the madrasa to formally present these demands. The demands are as follows:
 Anas Madani must be immediately expelled from the madrasa.
 Students must be provided with adequate institutional facilities and all forms of harassment must cease.
 Shah Ahmed Shafi should be granted due respect by removing him from the position of director, given his incapacity, and appointing him as an advisor.
 The complete rights and appointments of teachers should be entrusted to the Majlis-e-Shura.
 The rightful members of the previous Majlis-e-Shura should be reinstated and controversial members removed from their positions.

Outcome

See also 
 List of Darul Uloom Hathazari alumni

References 

Darul Uloom Hathazari
Hefazat-e-Islam Bangladesh
Student protests in Bangladesh
2018 in Bangladesh